Okyar is a Turkish surname. Notable people with the surname include:

 Fethi Okyar (1880–1943), Turkish diplomat and politician
 Suat Okyar (born 1972), Turkish footballer and manager
 Vedat Okyar (1945–2009), Turkish footballer and sports journalist

Turkish-language surnames